The 2004–05 NBA season was the 17th season for the Miami Heat in the National Basketball Association. The Heat entered the season with high expectations following the acquisition of All-Star center Shaquille O'Neal from the Los Angeles Lakers, plus signing free agents Christian Laettner, three-point specialist Damon Jones, and Shandon Anderson. O'Neal was traded away from the Lakers following recurrence of bad blood with former teammate Kobe Bryant. Despite their numerous conflicts during their 8 years as teammates, the duo led the Lakers to 3-straight championship titles from 2000 to 2002. The team played solid basketball posting a 14-game winning streak between December and January winning 25 of their first 32 games, then winning twelve straight between February and March. At midseason, the team re-signed free agent All-Star center Alonzo Mourning, and re-acquired former Heat guard Steve Smith from the expansion Charlotte Bobcats. The Heat finished in first place in both their division and conference with a 59–23 record, which was the franchise's best since 1996–97.

Second-year star Dwyane Wade led the Heat in scoring averaging 24.1 points per game, while O'Neal finished second on the team in scoring with 22.9 points per game. Both players were selected to play in the 2005 NBA All-Star Game at Denver, which marked Wade's first All-Star appearance.

In the first round of the playoffs, the Heat swept the New Jersey Nets in four straight games, then swept the Washington Wizards in four straight in the semi-finals. However, the Heat were eventually eliminated in seven games during the Eastern Conference Finals by the 2nd-seeded, and defending NBA champion Detroit Pistons. The Wade and Shaq-led Heat were expected by many to face the Spurs in the Finals (They would eventually meet 8 years later). Following the season, Eddie Jones was traded to the Memphis Grizzlies, Damon Jones signed as a free agent with the Cleveland Cavaliers, and Laettner and Smith both retired.

Key dates
 June 24 - The 2004 NBA Draft took place in New York City.
 July 8 - The free agency period started.
 July 14 - The Heat traded Lamar Odom, Caron Butler, Brian Grant and a 2006 first round draft pick (Jordan Farmar) to the Los Angeles Lakers in exchange for Shaquille O'Neal.
 October 5 - The Heat played their first preseason game on the road against the Houston Rockets at the Toyota Center.
 October 27 - The Heat's regular season began with an away game versus the New Jersey Nets at the Continental Airlines Arena.

Offseason

2004 NBA Draft

Free agency

Additions
Re-signings:
 Rasual Butler
Signings:
 Michael Doleac (from Denver)
 Keyon Dooling (from L.A. Clippers)
 Damon Jones (from Milwaukee)
 Christian Laettner (from Golden State)
 Wesley Person (from Atlanta)
Trades:
 Shaquille O'Neal (from L.A. Lakers)

Subtractions
Free agents:
 Rafer Alston (to Toronto)
 Samaki Walker (to Washington)
Trades:
 Caron Butler (to L.A. Lakers)
 Brian Grant (to L.A. Lakers)
 Lamar Odom (to L.A. Lakers)
Expansion draft:
 Loren Woods (to Charlotte)

Roster

Pre-season

Regular season

Standings

Record vs. opponents

Game log

Playoffs

|- align="center" bgcolor="#ccffcc"
| 1
| April 24
| New Jersey
| W 116–98
| Dwyane Wade (32)
| Haslem, O'Neal (11)
| Dwyane Wade (8)
| American Airlines Arena20,212
| 1–0
|- align="center" bgcolor="#ccffcc"
| 2
| April 26
| New Jersey
| W 104–87
| Alonzo Mourning (21)
| Shaquille O'Neal (10)
| Dwyane Wade (10)
| American Airlines Arena20,276
| 2–0
|- align="center" bgcolor="#ccffcc"
| 3
| April 28
| @ New Jersey
| W 108–105 (2OT)
| Shaquille O'Neal (25)
| Udonis Haslem (19)
| Dwyane Wade (8)
| Continental Airlines Arena20,174
| 3–0
|- align="center" bgcolor="#ccffcc"
| 4
| May 1
| @ New Jersey
| W 110–97
| Dwyane Wade (34)
| Udonis Haslem (11)
| Dwyane Wade (9)
| Continental Airlines Arena20,174
| 4–0
|-

|- align="center" bgcolor="#ccffcc"
| 1
| May 8
| Washington
| W 105–86
| Dwyane Wade (20)
| Eddie Jones (8)
| Dwyane Wade (7)
| American Airlines Arena20,151
| 1–0
|- align="center" bgcolor="#ccffcc"
| 2
| May 10
| Washington
| W 108–102
| Dwyane Wade (31)
| Udonis Haslem (13)
| Dwyane Wade (15)
| American Airlines Arena20,205
| 2–0
|- align="center" bgcolor="#ccffcc"
| 3
| May 12
| @ Washington
| W 102–95
| Dwyane Wade (31)
| Alonzo Mourning (13)
| D. Jones, Wade (6)
| MCI Center20,173
| 3–0
|- align="center" bgcolor="#ccffcc"
| 4
| May 14
| @ Washington
| W 99–95
| Dwyane Wade (42)
| Udonis Haslem (13)
| Damon Jones (6)
| MCI Center20,173
| 4–0
|-

|- align="center" bgcolor="#ffcccc"
| 1
| May 23
| Detroit
| L 81–90
| Eddie Jones (22)
| Eddie Jones (8)
| Damon Jones (5)
| American Airlines Arena20,203
| 0–1
|- align="center" bgcolor="#ccffcc"
| 2
| May 25
| Detroit
| W 92–86
| Dwyane Wade (40)
| Shaquille O'Neal (10)
| Dwyane Wade (6)
| American Airlines Arena20,228
| 1–1
|- align="center" bgcolor="#ccffcc"
| 3
| May 29
| @ Detroit
| W 113–104
| Dwyane Wade (36)
| D. Jones, Wade (7)
| D. Jones, O'Neal (5)
| The Palace of Auburn Hills22,076
| 2–1
|- align="center" bgcolor="#ffcccc"
| 4
| May 31
| @ Detroit
| L 96–106
| Dwyane Wade (28)
| Eddie Jones (10)
| Dwyane Wade (6)
| The Palace of Auburn Hills22,076
| 2–2
|- align="center" bgcolor="#ccffcc"
| 5
| June 2
| Detroit
| W 88–76
| Shaquille O'Neal (20)
| Udonis Haslem (13)
| Damon Jones (6)
| American Airlines Arena20,225
| 3–2
|- align="center" bgcolor="#ffcccc"
| 6
| June 4
| @ Detroit
| L 66–91
| Shaquille O'Neal (24)
| Shaquille O'Neal (13)
| Damon Jones (6)
| The Palace of Auburn Hills22,076
| 3–3
|- align="center" bgcolor="#ffcccc"
| 7
| June 6
| Detroit
| L 82–88
| Shaquille O'Neal (27)
| Udonis Haslem (10)
| Dwyane Wade (4)
| American Airlines Arena20,241
| 3–4
|-

Player statistics
Bold designates team leader.

Playoffs
Bold designates team leader.

Awards, records and milestones

Awards

Week/Month

All-Star

Season

Records

Milestones

Injuries and surgeries

Transactions

Trades
Shaquielle O'Neal from L.A. Lakers

Free agents

Additions

Subtractions

References

Miami Heat seasons
Miami Heat
Miami Heat
Miami Heat